Alexander Morris may refer to:

 Alexander Morris (politician) (1826–1889), Ontario politician
 Alexander Morris (cricketer) (1858–1918), New Zealand cricketer
 Alexander Webb Morris (1856–1935), Quebec politician
 Alex Morris (born 1976), English cricketer
 Alexander Morris (singer) (born 1971), American musical artist

See also
 Alexander Morrison (disambiguation)